The International Fund for Agricultural Development (IFAD;  (FIDA)) is an international financial institution and a specialised agency of the United Nations that works to address poverty and hunger in rural areas of developing countries. It is the only multilateral development organization that focuses solely on rural economies and food security.

Headquartered in Rome, IFAD is involved in over 200 projects across nearly 100 countries. It funds and sponsors initiatives that improve land and water management, develop rural infrastructure, train and educate farmers in more efficient technologies, build up resilience against climate change, enhancing market accessibility, and more.

IFAD has 177 member states and works in partnership with the Organization of the Petroleum Exporting Countries (OPEC) and members of the Organisation for Economic Co-operation and Development (OECD). Since its foundation in 1977, IFAD has provided US$22.4 billion in loans and grants and coordinated an addition US$31 billion in international and domestic co-financing.

History
IFAD was established as an international financial institution in 1977 through United Nations General Assembly Resolution 32/107 (30 December  1977) as one of the major outcomes of the 1974 World Food Conference. Its headquarters is in Rome, Italy, and it is a member of the United Nations Development Group. The current President of the IFAD is Alvaro Lario from Spain, who took over from Gilbert Houngbo in late 2022.

See also

Food security
Development Finance Institution
PROGETTAPS

References

External links
IFAD website

 
International development multilaterals
Agricultural organisations based in Italy
United Nations Development Group
United Nations specialized agencies
Organizations established in 1977
Organisations based in Rome
Italy and the United Nations